Adam A. Botana (born April 27, 1984) is an American politician serving as a member of the Florida House of Representatives from the 76th district. He assumed office on November 3, 2020.

Early life 
Botana was born in Naples, Florida and lives in Bonita Springs. He graduated from Barron G. Collier High School.

Career 
Botana is the vice president of the Bay Water Boat Club, his family's business. He has also worked in the food and beverage industry. Botana was elected to the Florida House of Representatives in November 2020. Botana partially campaigned on a platform of water policy. After assuming office, he was assigned to the House Health & Human Services Committee and House Agriculture & Natural Resources Appropriations Subcommittee.

References 

1984 births
Living people
People from Naples, Florida
People from Bonita Springs, Florida
Florida Republicans
Members of the Florida House of Representatives